Dr Desra Percaya (born 20 April 1961, in Malang, East Java), is an Indonesian diplomat who, since 2020, serves as Ambassador Extraordinary and Plenipotentiary of the Republic of Indonesia to the United Kingdom, accredited to Ireland and the International Maritime Organization.

Education
Percaya read Social and Political Sciences at Airlangga University, Surabaya, Indonesia, graduating with a Bachelor's degree, before pursuing further studies in International Studies at Birmingham University, where he received a Master's degree (MA) in 1995. He then took the degree of Doctor of Philosophy (PhD) at Durham University, with a thesis entitled "Sino-Indonesian Relations: A Study of Indonesian Perceptions of China" in 2000.

He was awarded the honorary degree of the Doctor of the University (DUniv) by the University of Birmingham in 2014.

Career
Percaya was appointed Ambassador and Permanent Representative of the Republic of Indonesia to the United Nations in New York in February 2012. He was elected Chairman of the United Nation's First Committee (Disarmament and International Security) on 4 September 2013, also serving as Vice-President of the Economic and Social Council (ECOSOC), Co-Facilitator on human rights treaty bodies, Chairman of the NAM Working Group on Disarmament, Vice-Chairman of the UN Committee on the Inalienable Rights of the Palestinian People, and Vice-Chairman of the UN Committee on Decolonization.

Percaya served as Director-General for Asia, Pacific, and Africa at the Indonesian Ministry of Foreign Affairs, and was previously Indonesia's Deputy Permanent Representative to the UN in Geneva, Switzerland. Before this he was Director of International Security and Disarmament in the Directorate of Multilateral Affairs in Jakarta between 2007 and 2009. He first joined Indonesia's Ministry of Foreign Affairs in 1986.

Personal life
Born in East Java on 20 April 1961 of Sundanese parentage, Percaya is married and has two children: Asteya Prima and Muhammad Dwi Aditya Percaya.

Honours and awards
  Bintang Mahaputera (Indonesia)
  Officier dans l'ordre de la Couronne (Belgium)
 Hon DUniv (Birmingham)

References

1961 births
Living people
People from Malang
Sundanese people
Airlangga University alumni
Alumni of the University of Birmingham
Alumni of Durham University
Permanent Representatives of Indonesia to the United Nations
Ambassadors of Indonesia to the United Kingdom
Indonesian diplomats